Melicope knudsenii, commonly known as Olokele Valley melicope or Knudsen's melicope, is a species of flowering plant in the family Rutaceae, that is endemic to Hawaii. It inhabits montane mesic forests dominated by Acacia koa, Metrosideros polymorpha, and Dicranopteris linearis on Kauai (Olokele Valley and Waimea Canyon) and East Maui (Auwahi). Associated plants include Syzygium sandwicensis, Cheirodendron trigynum, Myrsine lessertiana, Ilex anomala, Alphitonia ponderosa, Zanthoxylum dipetalum, Kadua terminalis, Pleomele aurea,
Bobea spp., Tetraplasandra waimeae, Xylosma hawaiensis, Eurya sandwicensis, Psychotria mariniana, Melicope anisata, Melicope barbigera, Pouteria sandwicensis, Dodonaea viscosa, and
Dianella sandwicensis. It is threatened by habitat loss. Like other Hawaiian Melicope, this species is known as alani. This is a federally listed endangered species of the United States.

This is a tree which can reach 10 meters tall. It bears large inflorescences containing up to 200 flowers each.

This tree is very rare today, existing only on the islands of Kauai and Maui in small numbers. By 2008 there were three individuals remaining on Kauai. A 1999 survey reported only a single wild individual remaining on Maui, and one cultivated tree in an arboretum. The latter is producing seeds, which are being collected. The seedlings will be planted in appropriate habitat.

References

External links
 
 

knudsenii
Endemic flora of Hawaii
Biota of Kauai
Biota of Maui
Taxonomy articles created by Polbot